Sandro Notaroberto Peci (born 10 March 1998) is a Venezuelan–Italian footballer who plays as a defender for Venezuelan Primera División side Caracas FC.

Club career
Notaroberto started his career at Deportivo La Guaira, making his debut in a 2015 Copa Venezuela game, before moving to Zulia for the 2016 season.

He played in his side's first game of the 2017 Copa Libertadores; a 2–1 loss to Chapecoense.

International career
Notaroberto represented the Venezuelan under 17 side at the 2015 South American Under-17 Football Championship, where his side were knocked out in the first round.

He was called up to the under 20 side in 2015. He was called up to the 2017 South American Youth Football Championship, but failed to make an appearance.

Career statistics

Club

Notes

References

1998 births
Living people
Venezuelan footballers
Venezuela youth international footballers
Association football defenders
Deportivo La Guaira players
Zulia F.C. players
Estudiantes de Caracas players
Caracas FC players
Venezuelan Primera División players
Venezuelan people of Italian descent
Footballers from Caracas